Michael William Tuffrey is a British Liberal Democrat politician who served as a  member of the London Assembly (AM) for Londonwide from 2002 to 2012. He took his seat on 18 February 2002 replacing Louise Bloom who had resigned. He was re-elected in 2004 and 2010 leading the Liberal Democrat group and chairing various London Assembly committees.  He is a member of the London Fire and Emergency Planning Authority first appointed in 2002 and serving as leader of the Liberal Democrat Group 2006 to 2008. Tuffrey was appointed to the London Sustainable Development Commission in 2004 and reappointed by Boris Johnson for a second term in 2008.

Tuffrey was narrowly beaten by former Metropolitan Police officer Brian Paddick in standing for nomination as the Liberal Democrats' candidate for Mayor of London in 2012.

Biography
Michael Tuffrey was born in Orpington and grew up in Bromley.  He was educated at Douai School, an independent Catholic school in Woolhampton. He then studied Economics at Durham University. He moved to Brixton where he got his first job as an accountant and started his political life as a member of the Greater London Council (1985-6) and was a councillor of the London Borough of Lambeth from 1990 to 2002.  He stood in Streatham in 1987, in the 1989 Vauxhall by-election, and again in Vauxhall in the 1992 General Election before leading Lambeth Council between 1994 and 1998.

Tuffrey was Leader of the Liberal Democrat London Assembly group from May 2006 until May 2010.  He was a member of the Assembly's Environment, Planning and Housing, and Audit Committees and is Deputy Chair of the Budget and Performance Management Committee. The Evening Standard named Tuffrey as one of the thousand most influential Londoners for his work on the environment.

Tuffrey is a qualified Chartered Accountant, and has worked as a finance director for a major national charity before starting up a consultancy business, Corporate Citizenship.

Tuffrey is married and has three children.  He lives with his family in Clapham, London. He is a parishioner of St Mary's Catholic Church, Clapham.

London Mayoral campaign

On 15 June 2011, Tuffrey launched his bid to become the Liberal Democrat candidate for Mayor of London in the 2012 election. Running against Lembit Öpik, Tuffrey was "widely tipped to become the Liberal Democrats' candidate". He emerged after nominations were reopened as the "anyone-but-Lembit" candidate, with Öpik's detractors claiming that he lacked gravitas and his supporters claiming only he had a sufficiently high-profile. However, in the event Brian Paddick emerged as the party's candidate.

References

Bibliography
Who's Who 2008, (A. & C. Black, 2007)

External links
Mike Tuffrey Liberal Democrat Voice members survey on London Mayoral Candidates
Mike Tuffrey news about Mayor of London campaign
Mike Tuffrey biography from the London Assembly 
Mike Tuffrey profile at the site of London Liberal Democrats

1959 births
Living people
Councillors in the London Borough of Lambeth
Members of the Greater London Council
Liberal Democrats (UK) parliamentary candidates
Alumni of University College, Durham
Liberal Democrat Members of the London Assembly